Luxembourg competed at the 1972 Summer Olympics in Munich, West Germany. 11 competitors, 10 men and 1 woman, took part in 8 events in 5 sports.

Archery

In the first modern archery competition at the Olympics, Luxembourg entered one man and one woman. Their highest placing competitor was Nelly Wies-Weyrich, at 24th place in the women's competition.
Men

Women

Athletics

Men
Track and road events

Cycling

Two cyclists represented Luxembourg in 1972.
Men

Fencing

Five fencers, all men, represented Luxembourg in 1972.

Men

Shooting

One male shooter represented Luxembourg in  1972.
Open

Water skiing (demonstration sports)

Women

References

Nations at the 1972 Summer Olympics
1972 Summer Olympics
1972 in Luxembourgian sport